Upstairs may refer to:

 Stairs
 Upstairs (album), a 2004 album by Shane & Shane
 Upstairs (film), a 1919 American silent comedy film

See also 
 Downstairs (disambiguation)